The Secret Code is a lost 1918 American silent drama film directed by Albert Parker and starring Gloria Swanson.

Plot
As described in a film magazine, Senator John Calhoun Rand (Sherry), a confirmed old bachelor, marries Sally Carter (Swanson), a young small town woman many years his junior. Washington society is amazed as the Senator had been regarded as the prize catch of the capital. While the society women gossip, secret service agents trace a leak back to the Senator's home. Suspicion points to Mrs. Rand. An investigation proves that she is blameless and that a trusted matron, close to the confidence of the Senator, is an agent of the Kaiser's and has been learning the nation's secrets. Humiliated by the thought that he had mistrusted his wife, John apologizes and Sally takes him back.

Cast
 Gloria Swanson as Sally Carter Rand
 J. Barney Sherry as Senator John Calhoun Rand
 Rhy Alexander as Lola Walling
 Leslie Stuart as Baron de Vorjeck (credited as Leslie Stewart)
 Joe King as Jefferson Harrow
 Dorothy Wallace as Mrs. Walker
 Lee Phelps as Towen Rage

References

External links

1918 films
1918 drama films
American silent feature films
American black-and-white films
Films directed by Albert Parker
Triangle Film Corporation films
Lost American films
Silent American drama films
1910s American films
1910s English-language films
English-language drama films